Arthur Champagne (18 August 1713 – 7 May 1799) was an Anglican priest in Ireland during the 18th century.

Champagne was born in Queen's County (now County Laois) and educated at Trinity College, Dublin. He was appointed a prebendary of Kildare Cathedral in 1741 and Vicar of Mullingar a year later. He was Dean of Clonmacnoise  from 1761 until his death.

References

Alumni of Trinity College Dublin
Deans of Clonmacnoise
People from County Laois
18th-century Irish Anglican priests
1713 births
1799 deaths